The United States Virgin Islands competed at the 2017 World Championships in Athletics in London, United Kingdom, from 4–13 August 2017.

Results

Men
Track and road events

References

Nations at the 2017 World Championships in Athletics
World Championships in Athletics
United States Virgin Islands at the World Championships in Athletics